The 2013 Hilton HHonors Skate America was the first event of six in the 2013–14 ISU Grand Prix of Figure Skating, a senior-level international invitational competition series. It was held at the Joe Louis Arena in Detroit, Michigan on October 17–20. Medals were awarded in the disciplines of men's singles, ladies' singles, pair skating, and ice dancing. Skaters earned points toward qualifying for the 2013–14 Grand Prix Final.

Eligibility
Skaters who reached the age of 14 before July 1, 2013 were eligible to compete on the senior Grand Prix circuit.

Entries
The entries were as follows.

Changes to initial lineup
On September 30, 2013, Evan Lysacek announced that his injury would force him out of Skate America. He was replaced by Jason Brown. Vanessa James / Morgan Cipres withdrew and were replaced by Margaret Purdy /  Michael Marinaro. Brian Joubert and Denis Ten also withdrew, and no substitutes were announced.

Results

Men

Ladies

Pairs

Ice dancing

References

External links

Skate America, 2013
Skate America